Remorques (English title: Stormy Waters) is a 1941 French drama film directed by Jean Grémillon. The screenplay was written by Jacques Prévert (scenario and dialogue) and André Cayatte (adaptation), based on the novel by Roger Vercel. The film stars Jean Gabin, Madeleine Renaud and Michèle Morgan.

It was shot at the Billancourt Studios in Paris and on location around Finistère in Brittany including at Brest. The film's sets were designed by the art director Alexandre Trauner. It was distributed in France by the Paris subsidiary of the German Tobis Film company. After the Second World War it was given an American release by MGM.

Plot
A tugboat captain indulges a love affair with a married woman, despite having a seriously ill wife in a small ocean front town.

Cast

 Jean Gabin as Captain André Laurent 
 Madeleine Renaud as Yvonne Laurent 
 Michèle Morgan as Catherine 
 Charles Blavette as Gabriel Tanguy 
 Jean Marchat as Marc, captain of the 'Mirva' 
 Nane Germon as Renée Tanguy
 Jean Dasté as Le radio
 René Bergeron as Georges
 Henri Poupon as Le docteur Maulette
 Anne Laurens as Marie Poubennec
 Marcel Pérès as Le Meur
 Marcel Duhamel as Pierre Poubennec
 Henri Pons as Roger
 Sinoël as L'armateur
 Fernand Ledouxas Kerlo, the boatswain

References

External links
 Remorques at Films de France
 
 
 Remorques at FilmCan

1941 romantic drama films
1941 films
Adultery in films
Films directed by Jean Grémillon
French romantic drama films
1940s French-language films
Seafaring films
Films with screenplays by Jacques Prévert
French black-and-white films
Tobis Film films
Films shot at Billancourt Studios
Films shot in France
Films set in France
1940s French films